Ray Landorf (born 24 January 1938) is a former  Australian rules footballer who played with South Melbourne in the Victorian Football League (VFL).

Notes

External links 

Living people
1938 births
Australian rules footballers from Victoria (Australia)
Sydney Swans players
Port Melbourne Football Club players